The Detroit Tigers Radio Network is an American radio network composed of 49 radio stations which carry English-language coverage of the Detroit Tigers, a professional baseball team in Major League Baseball (MLB).  Detroit's WXYT-FM (97.1 FM) serves as the network's  flagship. The network also includes 46 affiliates in the U.S. states of Michigan, Ohio, and Indiana: 25 AM stations, 15 of which supplement their signals with one or more low-power FM translators; 21 full-power FM stations; and one HD Radio digital subchannel which supplements its signal with a low-power FM translator. The network airs select spring Grapefruit League games, along with all 162 regular season games and all postseason games. Dan Dickerson does play-by-play for the broadcasts with color commentary provided by Jim Price (home games) and Bobby Scales (road games), and Jeff Riger is the studio host.  In addition to traditional over-the-air AM and FM broadcasts, network programming airs on SiriusXM satellite radio; and streams online via SiriusXM Internet Radio, TuneIn Premium, and MLB.com Gameday Audio.

Station list